St. John's Church, Secunderabad is a historic building, built in 1813, in Marredpalli, Secunderabad.  It is the oldest Christian church in Secunderabad.

History 
The church was built for British troops of the Secunderabad cantonment. British troops were allowed to bring guns inside, after guns kept outside were stolen once during the 1857 War of Indian Independence.

It was designated as a Heritage structure of Hyderabad in 1998.

Architecture

References

Secunderabad
Churches in Hyderabad, India
Heritage structures in Hyderabad, India